Varronia curassavica, synonym Cordia curassavica, commonly known as black sage or wild sage, is a species of flowering plant in the borage family, Boraginaceae. It is sometimes called tropical black sage to distinguish it from another unrelated species named black sage, Salvia mellifera. It is native to tropical America but has also been widely introduced to Southeast Asia and the tropical Pacific region, where it is an invasive weed. The specific epithet is a latinised form of Curaçao, an island in the southern Caribbean Sea region and the locality of the type collection.

Description
Black sage is a many-branched shrub growing up to 3 m in height and smelling strongly of sage.  Its leaves are lanceolate to ovate in shape, 40–100 mm long and 15–60 mm wide.  The small white flowers grow in clusters at the ends of the branches; they have a funnel-shaped corolla, 4–6 mm long.  The small, fleshy red fruits each contain a single 4–5 mm long seed.

References

Sources
 

Boraginaceae
Flora of Central America
Flora of South America
Plants described in 1760
Taxa named by Nikolaus Joseph von Jacquin